Aultman was a settlement now within the town of Camp Verde in Yavapai County, Arizona, United States.

History
Named after a resident, it had a post office between 1896 and 1916.

In 1910, Aultman was originally planned to be the site of a territorial highway bridge spanning the Verde River. However, a petition circulated in Camp Verde, Arizona, to relocate the highway and bridge to Camp Verde; Camp Verde was selected as the bridge site.

In the 1920s, the Aultman schoolhouse doubled as a polling location.

Aultman's population was 20 in 1940.

References

Populated places in Yavapai County, Arizona